In food processing, fermentation is the conversion of carbohydrates to alcohol or organic acids using microorganisms—yeasts or bacteria—under anaerobic (oxygen-free) conditions. Fermentation usually implies that the action of microorganisms is desired. The science of fermentation is known as zymology or zymurgy.

The term "fermentation" sometimes refers specifically to the chemical conversion of sugars into ethanol, producing alcoholic drinks such as wine, beer, and cider. However, similar processes take place in the leavening of bread (CO2 produced by yeast activity), and in the preservation of sour foods with the production of lactic acid, such as in  sauerkraut and yogurt.

Other widely consumed fermented foods include vinegar, olives, and cheese. More localised foods prepared by fermentation may also be based on beans, grain, vegetables, fruit, honey, dairy products, and fish.

History and prehistory

Natural fermentation precedes human history. Since ancient times, humans have exploited the fermentation process. The earliest archaeological evidence of fermentation is 13,000-year-old residues of a beer, with the consistency of gruel, found in a cave near Haifa in Israel. Another early alcoholic drink, made from fruit, rice, and honey, dates from 7000 to 6600 BC, in the Neolithic Chinese village of Jiahu, and winemaking dates from ca. 6000 BC, in Georgia, in the Caucasus area. Seven-thousand-year-old jars containing the remains of wine, now on display at the University of Pennsylvania, were excavated in the Zagros Mountains in Iran. There is strong evidence that people were fermenting alcoholic drinks in Babylon ca. 3000 BC, ancient Egypt ca. 3150 BC, pre-Hispanic Mexico ca. 2000 BC, and Sudan ca. 1500 BC.

The French chemist Louis Pasteur founded zymology, when in 1856 he connected yeast to fermentation.
When studying the fermentation of sugar to alcohol by yeast, Pasteur concluded that the fermentation was catalyzed by a vital force, called "ferments", within the yeast cells.  The "ferments" were thought to function only within living organisms. Pasteur wrote that "Alcoholic fermentation is an act correlated with the life and organization of the yeast cells, not with the death or putrefaction of the cells."

Nevertheless, it was known that yeast extracts can ferment sugar even in the absence of living yeast cells. While studying this process in 1897, the German chemist and zymologist Eduard Buchner of Humboldt University of Berlin, Germany, found that sugar was fermented even when there were no living yeast cells in the mixture, by an enzyme complex secreted by yeast that he termed zymase.  In 1907 he received the Nobel Prize in Chemistry for his research and discovery of "cell-free fermentation".

One year earlier, in 1906, ethanol fermentation studies led to the early discovery of oxidized nicotinamide adenine dinucleotide (NAD+).

Uses 

Food fermentation is the conversion of sugars and other carbohydrates into alcohol or preservative organic acids and carbon dioxide. All three products have found human uses. The production of alcohol is made use of when fruit juices are converted to wine, when grains are made into beer, and when foods rich in starch, such as potatoes, are fermented and then distilled to make spirits such as gin and vodka. The production of carbon dioxide is used to leaven bread. The production of organic acids is exploited to preserve and flavor vegetables and dairy products.

Food fermentation serves five main purposes: to enrich the diet through development of a diversity of flavors, aromas, and textures in food substrates; to preserve substantial amounts of food through lactic acid, alcohol, acetic acid, and alkaline  fermentations; to enrich food substrates with protein, essential amino acids, and vitamins; to eliminate antinutrients; and to reduce cooking time and the associated use of fuel.

Fermented foods by region

 Worldwide: alcohol (beer, wine), vinegar, olives, yogurt, bread, cheese
 Asia
 East and Southeast Asia: amazake, atchara, belacan, burong mangga, com ruou, doenjang, douchi, fish sauce, lah pet, lambanog, kimchi, kombucha, leppet-so, narezushi, miso, nata de coco, nattō, ngapi, oncom, padaek, pla ra, prahok, ruou nep, sake, shrimp paste, soju, soy sauce, stinky tofu, tape, tempeh, zha cai
 Central Asia: kumis, kefir, shubat, qatiq (yogurt)
 South Asia: achar, appam, dosa, dhokla, dahi (yogurt), idli, mixed pickle, ngari, sinki, tongba, paneer
 Africa: garri, injera, laxoox, mageu, ogi, ogiri, iru
 Americas: chicha, chocolate, vanilla, hot sauce, tibicos, pulque, muktuk, kiviak , parakari
 Middle East: torshi,  boza
 Europe: sourdough bread, elderberry wine, kombucha, pickling, rakfisk, sauerkraut, pickled cucumber, surströmming, mead, salami, sucuk, prosciutto, cultured milk products such as quark, kefir, filmjölk, crème fraîche, smetana, skyr, rakı, tupí, żur.
 Oceania: poi, kaanga pirau

Fermented foods by type

Beans
Cheonggukjang, doenjang, fermented bean curd, miso, natto, soy sauce, stinky tofu, tempeh, oncom, soybean paste, Beijing mung bean milk, kinama, iru, thua nao

Grain

Amazake, beer, bread, choujiu, gamju, injera, kvass, makgeolli, murri, ogi, rejuvelac, sake, sikhye, sourdough, sowans, rice wine, malt whisky, grain whisky, idli, dosa, Bangla (drink)
vodka, boza, and chicha, among others.

Vegetables
Kimchi, mixed pickle, sauerkraut, Indian pickle, gundruk, tursu

Fruit

Wine, vinegar, cider, perry, brandy, atchara, nata de coco, burong mangga, asinan, pickling, vişinată, chocolate, rakı, aragh sagi, chacha

Honey
Mead, metheglin

Dairy

Some kinds of cheese also, kefir, kumis (mare milk), shubat (camel milk), cultured milk products such as quark, filmjölk, crème fraîche, smetana, skyr, and yogurt

Fish

Bagoong, faseekh, fish sauce, Garum, Hákarl, jeotgal, ngapi, padaek, pla ra, prahok, rakfisk, shrimp paste, surströmming, shidal

Meat

Chorizo, salami, sucuk, pepperoni, nem chua, som moo, saucisson, fermented sausage

Tea
Pu-erh tea, Kombucha, Lahpet, Goishicha

Risks
Sterilization is an important factor to consider during the fermentation of foods. Failing to completely remove any microbes from equipment and storing vessels may result in the multiplication of harmful organisms within the ferment, potentially increasing the risks of food borne illnesses like botulism. However, botulism in vegetable ferments is only possible when not properly canned.  The production of off smells and discoloration may be indications that harmful bacteria may have been introduced to the food.

Alaska has witnessed a steady increase of cases of botulism since 1985. It has more cases of botulism than any other state in the United States of America. This is caused by the traditional Alaska Native practice of allowing animal products such as whole fish, fish heads, walrus, sea lion, and whale flippers, beaver tails, seal oil, and birds, to ferment for an extended period of time before being consumed. The risk is exacerbated when a plastic container is used for this purpose instead of the old-fashioned, traditional method, a grass-lined hole, as the Clostridium botulinum bacteria thrive in the anaerobic conditions created by the air-tight enclosure in plastic.

The World Health Organization has classified pickled foods as possibly carcinogenic, based on epidemiological studies. Other research found that fermented food contains a carcinogenic by-product, ethyl carbamate (urethane). "A 2009 review of the existing studies conducted across Asia concluded that regularly eating pickled vegetables roughly doubles a person's risk for esophageal squamous cell carcinoma."

See also

References

External links
Science aid: Fermentation - Process and uses of fermentation
Fermented cereals. A global perspective - FAO 1999

 
Alchemical processes
Biology and culture
Brewing
Chinese inventions
Culinary terminology
Fermentation

Food science
Metabolism
Mycology

de:Fermentation#Fermentation in der Lebens- und Genussmittelherstellung
sv:Fermentering